The canton of Fère-en-Tardenois is an administrative division in northern France. At the French canton reorganisation which came into effect in March 2015, the canton was expanded from 23 to 84 communes (9 of which merged into the new communes Les Septvallons and Bazoches-et-Saint-Thibaut):
 
Aizy-Jouy
Allemant
Augy
Bazoches-et-Saint-Thibaut
Beuvardes
Blanzy-lès-Fismes
Braine
Braye
Brenelle
Bruyères-sur-Fère
Bruys
Bucy-le-Long
Celles-sur-Aisne
Cerseuil
Le Charmel
Chassemy
Chavignon
Chavonne
Chéry-Chartreuve
Chivres-Val
Cierges
Ciry-Salsogne
Clamecy
Condé-sur-Aisne
Coulonges-Cohan
Courcelles-sur-Vesle
Courmont
Couvrelles
Cys-la-Commune
Dhuizel
Dravegny
Fère-en-Tardenois
Filain
Fresnes-en-Tardenois
Goussancourt
Jouaignes
Laffaux
Lesges
Lhuys
Limé
Loupeigne
Mareuil-en-Dôle
Margival
Missy-sur-Aisne
Monampteuil
Mont-Notre-Dame
Mont-Saint-Martin
Nanteuil-la-Fosse
Nanteuil-Notre-Dame
Neuville-sur-Margival
Ostel
Paars
Pargny-Filain
Pont-Arcy
Presles-et-Boves
Quincy-sous-le-Mont
Ronchères
Saint-Mard
Sancy-les-Cheminots
Saponay
Les Septvallons
Sergy
Seringes-et-Nesles
Serval
Soupir
Tannières
Terny-Sorny
Vailly-sur-Aisne
Vasseny
Vaudesson
Vauxtin
Vézilly
Viel-Arcy
Villers-Agron-Aiguizy
Villers-sur-Fère 
Ville-Savoye
Vuillery

Demographics

See also
Cantons of the Aisne department

References

Cantons of Aisne